Michael English is the self-titled debut album for Contemporary Christian artist Michael English. It was released in 1991.

At the 23rd GMA Dove Awards, Michael English won "New Artist of the Year" and "Male Vocalist of the Year" due to the album.

Track listing

Personnel 
 Michael English – vocals 
 Shane Keister – keyboards (1, 3, 4), Hammond B3 organ (5), acoustic piano (9)
 Blair Masters – keyboards (1, 2, 4, 6), drum programming (2, 6), arrangements (2, 6), additional keyboards (3, 8, 9), Hammond B3 organ (10)
 Dann Huff – guitars (1, 3, 4, 5, 9)
 Tom Hemby – guitars (2, 3, 5, 6, 9)
 Tommy Sims – bass (1, 3, 9), keyboards (7-10), guitars (7), drum programming (7, 8, 10), arrangements (7, 8, 10), backing vocals (9, 10)
 Jackie Street – fretless bass (2)
 Mike Brignardello – bass (4, 5)
 Paul Leim – drums (1, 3, 4, 5, 9)
 Eric Darken – percussion (3, 8), tambourine (9)
 Mark Douthit – saxophones (1, 5, 6)
 Marty Paoletta – saxophone (10)
 Barry Green – trombone (1, 5, 6)
 Mike Haynes – trumpet (1, 5, 6)
 Mike Morris – horn arrangements (1, 5, 6)
 Brown Bannister – arrangements (2)
 Chris Harris – backing vocals (1, 3)
 Donna McElroy – backing vocals (1, 6)
 Chris Rodriguez – backing vocals (1, 6, 9, 10)
 Wayne Kirkpatrick – backing vocals (3)
 Mark Heimmerman – backing vocals (3, 6)
 Wayburn Dean – backing vocals (5, 7)
 George Pendergrass – backing vocals (5, 7)
 The Brooklyn Tabernacle Choir – backing vocals (7, 10)
 Kim Fleming – backing vocals (9, 10)
 Vicki Hampton – backing vocals (9, 10)

Production 
 Neal Joseph – executive producer 
 Brown Bannister – producer, overdub engineer 
 Jeff Balding – track recording 
 Bill Deaton – track recording, overdub engineer, mixing (1-4)
 Billy Whittington – track recording, overdub engineer, mixing (5-10)
 Steve Bishir – overdub engineer 
 Dan Rudin – overdub engineer 
 Greg Parker – assistant engineer
 Carry Summers – assistant engineer  
 Craig White – assistant engineer
 Doug Sax – mastering 
 Traci Sterling – production coordinator
 Bill Brunt – art direction, design 
 Laura LiPuma Nash – art direction
 Mark Tucker – photography 
 Breon Reynolds – make-up
 Norman Miller at Proper Management – management 

Studios
 Recorded at The Dugout, OmniSound Studios and Quad Studios (Nashville, Tennessee); Kaleidoscope Sound (Bellevue, Tennessee); East Side Sound (New York City, New York).
 Mixed at MasterMix and Back Stage Studios (Nashville, Tennessee).
 Mastered at The Mastering Lab (Hollywood, California).

References

External links
Michael English at AllMusic

1992 debut albums
Michael English (American singer) albums